A pecuniary externality occurs when the actions of an economic agent cause an increase or decrease in market prices. For example, an influx of city-dwellers buying second homes in a rural area can drive up house prices, making it difficult for young people in the area to buy a house. The externality operates through prices rather than through real resource effects. 

This is in contrast with technological or real externalities that have a direct resource effect on a third party. For example, pollution from a factory directly harms the environment.  As with real externalities, pecuniary externalities can be either positive (favorable, as when consumers face a lower price) or negative (unfavorable, as when they face a higher price).

The distinction between pecuniary and technological externalities was originally introduced by Jacob Viner, who did not use the term externalities explicitly but distinguished between economies (positive externalities) and diseconomies (negative externalities).

Under complete markets, pecuniary externalities offset each other. For example, if someone buys whiskey and this raises the price of whiskey, the other consumers of whiskey will be worse off and the producers of whiskey will be better off. However, the loss to consumers is precisely offset by the gain to producers; therefore the resulting equilibrium is still Pareto efficient. As a result, some economists have suggested that pecuniary externalities are not really externalities and should not be called such. 

However, when markets are incomplete or constrained, then pecuniary externalities are relevant for Pareto efficiency. The reason is that under incomplete markets, the relative marginal utilities of agents are not equated. Therefore, the welfare effects of a price movement on consumers and producers do not generally offset each other.

This inefficiency is particularly relevant in financial economics. When some agents are subject to financial constraints, then changes in their net worth or collateral that result from pecuniary externalities may have first order welfare implications. The free market equilibrium in such an environment is generally not considered Pareto efficient. This is an important welfare-theoretic justification for macroprudential regulation that may require the introduction of targeted policy tools.

Roland McKean was the first to distinguish technological and pecuniary effects.

References

External links
Steve Landsburg's The Tragedy of the Chametz

Pricing